The Nations Cup 1972-73 was the 13th edition of a European rugby union championship for national teams, and eighth (and last) with the formula and the name of "Nations Cup".

The tournament was won by France, who won all their three games, with Romania, Spain and Morocco.

First division 
Table

Results

Second Division

Pool  1 

 Aggregate: Poland 39- Czechoslovakia 15

Pool 2 
Table

Results

Final

 Aggregate: Poland 38 - Portugal 26
 Poland promoted to division 1

Bibliography 
 Francesco Volpe, Valerio Vecchiarelli (2000), 2000 Italia in Meta, Storia della nazionale italiana di rugby dagli albori al Sei Nazioni, GS Editore (2000) 
 Francesco Volpe, Paolo Pacitti (Author), Rugby 2000, GTE Gruppo Editorale (1999).

References

External links
 FIRA-AER official website

1972–73 in European rugby union
1972–73
1973 rugby union tournaments for national teams
1972 rugby union tournaments for national teams